Baiami brockmani is a species of araneomorph spiders in the family Desidae.

Distribution 
This species is endemic to South West Western Australia.

Description 

Etymology 
The name of the species, composed of brockman and the latin suffix , "living in", is in reference to the place of its discovery, Brockman National Park.

References 

Desidae
Spiders of Australia
Spiders described in 1981